The 1998 California Secretary of State election occurred on November 3, 1998. The primary elections took place on June 3, 1998. The Republican incumbent, Bill Jones, narrowly defeated the Democratic nominee, Michela Alioto. , this was the last time a Republican was elected California Secretary of State.

Primary results
Final results from California Secretary of State.

Peace & Freedom

Others

General election results
Final results from the Secretary of State of California.

Results by county
Final results from the Secretary of State of California.

See also
California state elections, 1998
State of California
Secretary of State of California

References

Secretary of State election
California Secretary of State elections
California
California Secretary of State election